The 37th Women's Boat Race took place on 21 March 1982. The contest was between crews from the Universities of Oxford and Cambridge and held as part of the Henley Boat Races along a two-kilometre course.

Background
The first Women's Boat Race was conducted on The Isis in 1927.  It was the first race in the history of the event to include a male participant, in Oxford's cox Phillip Edwards.

Crews

Coaches 
Oxford: M. Rosewell, A. Truswell, R. Emerton, A. Walsh.

Cambridge: R. Wiggin, J. Sutherland-Smith, N. Burnet*, S. Jones, J. Gleave, N. Casey, N Kirkby*.

*Co-Chief Coach

Race
Cambridge won by four seconds.

See also
The Boat Race 1982

References

External links
 Official website

Women's Boat Race
1982 in English sport
Boat
March 1982 sports events in the United Kingdom
1982 in women's rowing
1982 sports events in London